Hoshihananomia perlata is a species of beetle in the genus Hoshihananomia of the family Mordellidae, which is part of the superfamily Tenebrionoidea. It was discovered in 1776.

References

Beetles described in 1776
Mordellidae
Taxa named by Johann Heinrich Sulzer